D&W Performance is a performance engine and drivetrain component distributor, headquartered in Auburn, NY. The company installs and distributes performance powertrain products for both gas and diesel applications. D&W supplies performance powertrain components from manufacturers such as: Garrett, Vibrant, Turbosmart, MBRP, PacBrake, FASS, TS, Bully Dog, and BD. Along with its corporate location, D&W Performance has five other locations with technical support teams and installation experts. D&W has over 200 employees.

History

Founded in January 1976, D&W Diesel began as a starter and generator repair shop. In 1980, D&W Diesel expanded its product lines to include the sales and service of turbochargers, and the growth continued.  In the following years D&W added more product lines and opened additional sales and service locations in Albany, Buffalo and Rochester, New York; Worcester, Massachusetts and Cleveland, Ohio.    

In 1999, D&W was named a Garrett Master Distributor.  D&W Performance distributes Garrett products to the Northeastern United States and to Eastern Canada.  As an extension of the performance turbocharging marketing efforts, D&W invested in the business of installing and distributing performance powertrain products for both gas and diesel applications.  From there, D&W Performance grew their product distribution to include such brands as Bully Dog, BD Diesel, FASS, Vibrant, TiAL, Turbosmart, MBRP and PacBrake.    

In 2008, D&W Performance launched a new website, dwperformance.com, which targets the expanding performance products market.

Locations

 Auburn, New York / Corporate Headquarters
 Binghamton, New York
 Cleveland, Ohio
 Buffalo, New York
 Rochester, New York
 Albany, New York
 Worcester, Massachusetts
 Philadelphia, Pennsylvania

Quick Facts

 Founded: January 1976 
 Founder: Doug Wayne
 Headquarters: Auburn, NY
 Area Served: USA and Canada
 Industry: Automotive
 Website: https://web.archive.org/web/20100226083232/http://www.dwperformance.com/

Brands Offered
 D&W Performance
 Garrett (also known as Honeywell Turbo Technologies)
 Vibrant
 Turbosmart
 Bully Dog
 BD Diesel
 TiAL Sport
 TS Performance
 Edge Products
 Snow Performance
 South Bend
 Stanadyne
 Color Bond
 MBRP
 PacBrake
 Auto Meter
 Spearco
 Turbonetics

References 

Companies based in New York (state)
1976 establishments in New York (state)